The G-spot is a debated area of the human vagina.

G-Spot or GSpot can also refer to:

G-Spot (TV series), a Canadian television series